Bautista Merlini (born 4 July 1995) is an Argentine footballer who plays as a left winger for Paraguayan club Club Libertad.

Career statistics

References

1995 births
Living people
Argentine footballers
Argentine expatriate footballers
Association football midfielders
Argentine people of Italian descent
Club Atlético Platense footballers
San Lorenzo de Almagro footballers
Defensa y Justicia footballers
Club Guaraní players
Club Libertad footballers
Argentine Primera División players
Paraguayan Primera División players
Argentine expatriate sportspeople in Paraguay
Expatriate footballers in Paraguay
People from Vicente López Partido
Sportspeople from Buenos Aires Province